"Bhula Dunga" is a 2020 Indian Hindi-language song, sung and composed by Darshan Raval, starring Sidharth Shukla  and Shehnaaz Gill.

Background and release
The first look of a song was out on 17 March 2020 titled "Bhula Dunga". The song was released on 24 March 2020 by Indie Music Label Channel on YouTube.

Reception
The song crossed more than 30 million views in less than 4 days of its release and 50 million views in few days. The song became an instant hit and became the most commented Indian song till that time. It defeated Justin Bieber's "Sorry" and entered into Top 40 Most commented songs of all time worldwide.

Personnel
Song: Bhula Dunga
Singer & composer: Darshan Raval
Starring: Sidharth Shukla & Shehnaaz Gill
Lyrics: Gurpreet Saini & Gautam Sharma
Producer: Kaushal Joshi
Director: Punit Jayesh Pathak
D.O.P: Dhruwal Patel
DOP on second camera: Shivam Singh
Focus puller: Manoj Yadav, Alok Yadav
Assistant Directors: Akash Shetty, Rutuja Parekh, Hiten Shah
Editor: Pankaj Sharma
Colourist: Rahill Merchant
Executive Producer: Amit Vij Production
Controller: Vivek Johar
Stylist: Ken Ferns

References

External links

2020 singles
2020 songs
Hindi-language songs
Indian songs